UDD, shortened for Up Dharma Down, is a Filipino band formed in Manila in 2004. They have released four albums Fragmented, Bipolar, Capacities and U D D released under independent record label  Terno Recordings.

In 2005, the band won the coveted In the Raw Award at the NU 107 Rock Awards as well as Best New Artist and Best Female Award for vocalist and keyboardist, Armi Millare, in 2006. In 2008, they were awarded Favorite Indie Artist at the Myx Music Awards.

Mark Coles' BBC show tagged them as the Asian band to most likely cross over to North American shores, and has been featured in numerous regional shows together with bands such as Arcade Fire (Canada) and Bloc Party (UK). They have also been recognized by Paul Buchanan of The Blue Nile, Curt Smith of Tears for Fears and Tim Bowness of No-Man. They were featured in the July 2007 issue of Time magazine. The band has opened for acts such as Red Hot Chili Peppers, Incubus,  Bloc Party,  The XX,  Tegan and Sara, Tahiti 80, and Cut Copy.

On January 1, 2017, the band officially renamed to its initials UDD.

On December 26, 2021, The band announced via Twitter that lead vocalist Armi Millare has left the band and will continue as a solo artist.

 Band members Current membersCarlos Tañada - lead guitars, synthesizers (since 2004)
Ean Mayor - drums, samplers (since 2004)
Paul Yap - bass, synthesizers (since 2004)Past members'''
Armi Millare - keyboards, vocals (2004–2021)

 Discography 
 Studio albums Fragmented (2006, Terno Recordings)Bipolar (2008, Terno Recordings)Capacities (2012, Terno Recordings)U D D (2019, Terno Recordings)

 Singles 

 Compilation Tracks Hopia Mani Popcorn (The Best of Manila Sound) - "Bitin sa'yo"Kami nAPO Muna Ulit (APO Hiking Society Tribute Album) - "Kaibigan"Today is T-shirt Day - "Malikmata (Side Sampler Remix)"Environmentally Sound: A Select Anthology of Songs Inspired by the Earth - "Maybe"
"We Give In Sometimes" (from Fragmented)

 Soundtrack Ang Pamana (The Inheritance) - "Flicker"Mayohan - "Hiwaga [Acoustic Version]"Ilumina (TV Series) - "Tadhana"Sana Dati (Cinemalaya 2013) - "Indak"That Thing Called Tadhana (Cinema One Originals 2014) - "Tadhana"Apocalypse Child - "Young Again (by Armi Millare)"Kung Paano Siya Nawala - "Anino"Trese (Netflix Anime)  - "Paagi"

 Ad Campaigns 
Coca-Cola Philippines 2006 - "Buhay Coke, Sarap Mo"
Lipton Tea Philippines 2007 - "Clarity"
Belo Medical Group 2008 - "Taya"
McDonald's Philippines 2008 - "Float Away"
Globe Telecom Philippines 2014 - "New World"
Singapore Tourism Board Singapore 2015 - "All The Good Things"
Cadbury Dairy Milk Philippines 2015
Oreo Asia 2015 - "Isang Lahat"
Close-Up Philippines 2016 - "Just A Smile" - Originally sung by Barbie Almalbis
Globe Studios Valentines 2017  "Unti-unti"
Hyundai “Gusto Revolution” 2017 - "Gusto Ko (Pagsundo)"

 Music videos 

 Cover Songs 
"Sana Dalawa ang Puso Ko" - Bodjie Dasig
"One on One" - Hall and Oates
"Here Comes the Rain Again" - Eurythmics
"Kaibigan" - Apo Hiking Society (Kami nAPO Muna ULIT)
"Just A Smile" - Barbie Almalbis
"Tinseltown in the Rain" - The Blue Nile
"Maikee's Letter" - Just Hush

 Awards and nominations 

 Recognitions 
First Filipino Band to be featured in MTV's “Advance Warning”, showcasing up-and-coming artists in the Asian region and worldwide.
Featured in Mark Coles' BBC Radio Show as the "Manila band most likely to cross over to the lucrative Anglophone market of North America."
Featured in July issue of Time'' magazine.
Featured as one of Metromix USA's "Bands We Like."

References

External links 
Official site

Filipino rock music groups
Musical groups from Manila
Musical groups established in 2004